Ride the Ducks was a national duck tour operator and eponymous tourist attraction in some parts of the United States and Guam. It had made use of amphibious vehicles, nicknamed "ducks", to provide tours of cities by boat and by land.

Ride the Ducks was purchased by Herschend Family Entertainment Corporation in 2004. Herschend sold a majority interest in the company to an independent investor in 2012. The Branson operation was sold to Ripley Entertainment in December 2017. In 2019 Ripley announced that Ride The Ducks in Branson would be permanently shut down and replaced by another attraction due to the July 2018 accident on Table Rock Lake where 17 people drowned.

Operations

The company used custom-built amphibious vehicles based on the DUKW amphibious vehicle design from World War II known as "truck ducks", while some used an original DUKW chassis extended to fit them, known as "stretch ducks". The company also used original DUKWs extended to hold more people, and as such are also "stretch ducks". All incorporated advances in marine design and safety. Drivers were certified by the Coast Guard and hold commercial drivers' licenses, and all vehicles were equipped with personal flotation devices. The company has also manufactured vehicles for other duck tour operators.

Locations
Ride the Ducks also formerly operated in a number of additional locations across the United States and one location in Guam:

Branson, Missouri (Opened: 1977, Closed: 2018)
Boston, Massachusetts (Under the name "Boston Duck Tours") (Opened: 1994)
Seattle, Washington (Under the name "Ride the Ducks of Seattle") (Opened: 1997, Closed: 2020)
Baltimore, Maryland (Opened: 2002, Closed: 2009)
Philadelphia, Pennsylvania (Opened: 2003, Closed: 2016)
Stone Mountain, Georgia (Opened: 2003, Closed: 2018)
Memphis, Tennessee (Opened: 2005, Closed: 2007)
San Francisco, California (Opened: 2008, Closed: 2015)
Newport, Kentucky (Opened: 2008, Closed: 2018)
Tamuning, Guam (Opened: 2014)
Mobile, Alabama (Under the name "Gulf Coast Ducks") (Opened: 2016, Closed: 2019)

Incidents
The duck boats operated by Ride the Ducks have been involved in a number of incidents.

July 2010 accident
In July 2010, a Ride the Ducks vehicle stalled on the Delaware River in Philadelphia, Pennsylvania, and was struck by a barge being pushed by a tugboat, sinking the duck boat and killing two of the passengers, who were Hungarian tourists. The National Transportation Safety Board determined that the probable cause of the accident was the tugboat operator's inattention to his duties. The tugboat operator served a one-year sentence for “the maritime equivalent of involuntary manslaughter.” Six years after the accident, Ride The Ducks ceased operations in Philadelphia.

Sept 2015 accident
On September 24, 2015, a Ride the Ducks vehicle operated by an independent firm Ride the Ducks of Seattle broke an axle, crossed the center lane and crashed into a charter bus, killing five people on Seattle's Aurora Bridge. The vehicle had been purchased from the Missouri-based manufacturer, and had not undergone a recommended repair to the front axle. The Missouri firm paid a fine of $1 million. In 2019, a jury in King County found Ride the Ducks International liable for 67% of a $123 million judgment stemming from the accident on the Aurora Bridge.

July 2018 accident

On July 19, 2018, a Ride the Ducks vehicle capsized and sank while in Table Rock Lake near Branson, Missouri, during high winds from nearby thunderstorms. 31 individuals were on board, and 17 fatalities were confirmed. The day following the accident, Ride the Ducks announced that the Branson operation would be "closed for business" pending an investigation and out of respect for the victims' families. The boat involved was an original from World War II having been built in 1944. In March 2019, Ride The Ducks announced they would be permanently shut down due to the investigation and overwhelming legal issues after the incident.
A replacement attraction, Top Ops, opened in June 2019 at the same location.

References

Tourist attractions in Stone County, Missouri
Transportation in Stone County, Missouri
Transport companies established in 1977
1977 establishments in Missouri